Nabataean Arabic was the dialect of Arabic spoken by the Nabataeans in antiquity.

In the 1st century AD, the Nabataeans wrote their inscriptions, such as the legal texts carved on the façades of the monumental tombs at Mada'in Salih, ancient Ḥegrā, in Nabataean Aramaic.

It is probable, however, that some or all of them, possibly in varying proportion depending on the region of the Nabataean Kingdom where they lived, spoke Arabic.

Phonology

Consonants 

  These consonants were probably voiceless, in contrast with Old Higazi, where they may have been voiced It is clear that in southern Syria the two sounds had not merged and that they remained voiceless.

Vowels 

In contrast with Old Higazi and Classical Arabic, Nabataean Arabic may have undergone the shift  < * and  < *, as evidenced by the numerous Greek transcriptions of Arabic from the area. This may have occurred in Safaitic as well, making it a possible Northern Old Arabic isogloss.

Nabataean א in دوسرا (dwsrʾ) does not signal ; it would seem that *ay# collapsed to something like . Scribes must have felt that this sound was closer to א when the spelling conventions of Nabataean were fixed. In Greek transcription, this sound was felt to be closer to an e-class vowel, yielding Δουσαρης.

Grammar 

Proto-Arabic nouns could take one of the five above declensions in their basic, unbound form. The definite article spread areally among the Central Semitic languages and it would seem that Proto-Arabic lacked any overt marking of definiteness.

Final short vowels were lost, then nunation was lost, producing a new set of final short vowels. The definite article /ʾal-/ entered the language shortly after this stage.

The ʿEn ʿAvdat inscription shows that final [n] had been deleted in undetermined triptotes, and that the final short vowels of the determined state were intact. The reconstructed text of the inscription is as follows:

pa-yapʿal lā pedā wa lā ʾaṯara
pa-kon honā yabġe-nā ʾal-mawto lā ʾabġā-h
pa-kon honā ʾarād gorḥo lā yorde-nā

Translation: "And he acts neither for benefit nor favour and if death claims us let me not be claimed. And if an affliction occurs let it not afflict us".

In JSNab 17, All Arabic triptotes terminate in w regardless of their syntactic position or whether they are defined.

References

External links 

Arabic languages
Extinct languages of Asia
Languages attested from the 4th century BC
Languages extinct in the 1st century
Nabataea